Ian Taylor (11 March 1944 – 19 January 2001) was a British sociologist. He was born in Sheffield.

Taylor completed his undergraduate degree at Durham University, where he was an active socialist and involved in the Anti-Apartheid Movement. He continued his studies at Cambridge before returning to Durham for his doctorate.

National Deviancy Symposium and Critical Criminology 

Taylor was one of the founding members of the National Deviancy Symposium and was one of the co-authors of The New Criminology: For a Social Theory of Deviance in 1973 along with Jock Young and Paul Walton, as well as later editing Critical Criminology with both of them.

In 1981, whilst lecturing at Sheffield University he wrote Law and Order: Arguments for Socialism, which Jock Young states:

"[it] forcefully argued the need for parties of the left to take seriously the problems of crime"

Moving to Canada shortly after, he lectured at Carleton University before returning to become chair of Sociology at the University of Salford. On leaving Salford, he became the Principal of Van Mildert College, Durham until he retired due to illness.

Left realism and beyond 

In 1999 he published his final book, Crime in Context after becoming Principal of Van Mildert College at Durham University, a role he stepped down from a year prior to his death due to his ill health.

In Crime in Context, he sets out his relationship to the left realism project, saying that his involvement was 'more tangential' than with Critical Criminology, and that

Publications and articles

1960s
Taylor, I. (1968) Football Mad: A Speculative Sociology of Football Hooliganism", NDC 1st Symposium (November)
Taylor, Ian and Laurie Taylor.  'We are All Deviants Now',  International Socialism 34 (1968)  1st series

1970s
Taylor, I. & Walton, P.  (1970)  "Values in deviancy theory and society", The British Journal of Sociology, XXI (4): 362 - 74
Taylor, I. (1971) "Theories of action in juvenile correction facilities", Unpulished paper given to the First Anglo-Scandinavian Seminar in Criminology, Norway, September 1971
Taylor, I. (1971) "The new criminology in an age of doubt", New Edinburgh Review, 15 (November): 14-17
Taylor, L. & Taylor, I. (eds) (1972) Politics and Deviance, Harmondsworth: Penguin
Taylor, I., Walton, P. & Young, J. (1973) The New Criminology: For a Social Theory of Deviance (International Library of Sociology), Routledge. 
Taylor I., Walton P. Young  J. (eds) (1975) Critical Criminology, London: Routledge and Kegan Paul
Bianchi, H., Simondi, M. & Taylor, I. (1975) Deviance and Control in Europe, London: John Wiley

1980s
Taylor, I. (1982) Law and Order: Arguments for Socialism, London: Macmillan
Taylor, I. (1987) "Law and Order, Moral Order: The Changing Rhetorics of the Thatcher Government" In: Miliband, R., Pantich, L. & Saville, J. (eds) The Socialist Register, London: The Merlin Press

1990s
Taylor, I. (1992) "The International Drug Trade and Money Laundering: Border Control and Other Issues", European Sociological Review, 8 (1): 181-193
Taylor, I. (1993) "Driving the Vermin off the Streets", New Statesman and Society, (8 October): 16-18
Taylor, I. (1994) "The Political Economy of Crime" In: Maguire, M., Morgan, R. & Reiner, R. (eds.) The Oxford Handbook of Criminology, Oxford: Oxford University Press
Taylor, I. (1997) "Free Markets and the Costs of Crime: An Audit of England and Wales" In: Walton, P. & Young, J. (eds) The New Criminology Revisited, Basingstoke: Macmillan
Taylor, I. (1997) "Crime and Social Insecurity in Europe", Criminal Justice Matters, 27 (Spring): 3-5
Ruggerio, V., South, N. & Taylor, I. (eds) (1998)The New European Criminology: Crime and social order in Europe, London: Routledge
-Taylor, I. (1998) "Crime, market-liberalism and the European idea"
Taylor, I. (1999) "Respectable, Rural and English: the Lobby Against the Regulation of Firearms in Great Britain" In: Carlen, P. & Morgan, R. (eds) Crime Unlimited: Questions for the 21st Century, Basingstoke: Macmillan
Taylor, I. (1999). Crime in Context: A Critical Criminology of Market Societies'', Oxford: Polity Press

References

External links
Jock Young's Obituary for Ian Taylor
University of Durham Obituary for Ian Taylor
Dave Harris's notes on critical criminology

1944 births
2001 deaths
Alumni of Hatfield College, Durham
Academics of the University of Sheffield
Academics of the University of Salford
British criminologists
British sociologists
Principals of Van Mildert College, Durham